Alex Rohde (born January 17, 1991), better known by his ring names Alexander Hammerstone or simply Hammerstone is an American professional wrestler. He is currently signed to Major League Wrestling, where he is the current MLW World Heavyweight Champion in his first reign. He was also the inaugural and longest reigning MLW National Openweight Champion.

Professional wrestling career

Early life and career (2013–2016)
Hammerstone is originally from Phoenix, Arizona. He debuted on the Arizona independent circuit in 2013 with Championship Wrestling from Arizona (CWFA) and Arizona Wrestling Federation (AWF). In 2014, he wrestled in Las Vegas for Paragon Pro Wrestling (PPW) and Future Stars of Wrestling (FSW) and West Coast Wrestling Connection (WCWC) in Oregon. There he won his first championship, the WCWC Legacy Championship, in 2014, which he held for 132 days. He followed that later in 2014 with the WCWC Tag Team Championship with partner Grappler 3 (as The Wrecking Crew). Later in 2014, Hammerstone capped his time at WCWC by winning the WCWC Pacific Northwest Championship. In 2015, Hammerstone had a tryout with WWE. In April 2015, he won the PPW Tag Team Championship. In February 2016, he would participate in another WWE tryout. Around this time he also did extra work for the company, one time appearing as Tyler Breeze's bodyguard.

Independent circuit (2016–present) 
In 2016, Hammerstone started working in California where he appeared for Championship Wrestling from Hollywood and made his debut for PCW Ultra. In 2017, he won the FSW Championship from Eli Drake. During the next two years he would hold the FSW Championship for over 600 combined days. He would receive additional tryouts from WWE in October 2017 and February 2018.

In 2018, he started being pushed heavily in PCW Ultra, getting wins against veteran wrestlers such as, Jeff Cobb, Brian Cage, Daga, Brody King, A. C. H., and Timothy Thatcher. In September of that year, at PCW Ultra Vision Quest, he challenged Penta El Zero M for the PCW Ultra Heavyweight Championship in a losing effort. That same year, he would wrestle for the nationally broadcast Ring Warriors during their first season.

On January 3, 2019, Hammerstone competed in a one night tournament for West Coast Pro Wrestling at their event, When the Smoke Clears, to crown the first WCPW Heavyweight Champion. He defeated Tyler Bateman in the finals. In January 2019 , he also competed on Impact Wrestling's Impact Xplosion, making his debut for the promotion.

Major League Wrestling

The Dynasty (2019–2021)

On February 2, 2019, Hammerstone debuted for Major League Wrestling (MLW). His first match featured him in a squash match against Ariel Dominguez. On the March 16 episode of Fusion, Hammerstone attacked The Hart Foundation (Teddy Hart, Brian Pillman Jr. and Davey Boy Smith Jr.) and joined the villainous stable The Dynasty, the other members including Richard Holliday and Maxwell Jacob Friedman. Hammerstone later defeated Pillman on the March 23 episode of Fusion.

During WrestleMania 35 weekend, he wrestled in the second annual Battle Riot match at the namesake event as the #34 entrant. He eliminated Brian Pillman Jr., Ariel Dominguez and Davey Boy Smith Jr., lasting until the final four until being eliminated by Mance Warner. On the April 26 episode of Fusion, Dynasty defeated Hart Foundation in a tables match. The match ended with Hammerstone putting Pillman through the table. Hammerstone was announced for the tournament to crown the inaugural National Openweight Champion. He defeated Gringo Loco in the semi-final on the May 11 episode of Fusion, and Brian Pillman Jr. in the final at Fury Road on June 1 to become the first National Openweight Champion.

Hammerstone successfully defended the title against Kotto Brazil at Kings of Colosseum, Davey Boy Smith Jr. via disqualification on the July 20 episode of Fusion and the Caribbean Heavyweight Champion Savio Vega on the August 10 episode of Fusion. On the October 12 episode of Fusion, Hammerstone defended the title against the Crash Heavyweight Champion Rey Horus in a title versus title match. Hammerstone lost via disqualification after interference by the Dynasty. The feud between Dynasty and the Hart Foundation continued as Hammerstone successfully defended the National Openweight Championship against Davey Boy Smith Jr. at MLW's first pay-per-view event Saturday Night SuperFight. After a successful title defense against Douglas James on the November 23 episode of Fusion, Hammerstone participated in the inaugural Opera Cup tournament, where he defeated his teammate MJF in the quarterfinal but lost to the eventual winner Davey Boy Smith Jr. in the semifinal.

Hammerstone continued to successfully defend the National Openweight Championship against the likes of Aero Star, T-Hawk and Laredo Kid in 2020 before MLW went on hiatus due to the COVID-19 pandemic. The storyline explanation was that Contra Unit attacked several MLW wrestlers and hijacked MLW's headquarters. MLW resumed holding events in November. It was explained in storyline that Hammerstone was a primary force in retrieving MLW from Contra Unit's occupation. The first episode of Fusion in several months took place on November 18, where Hammerstone defeated Jason Dugan and demanded a title shot against Jacob Fatu for the MLW World Heavyweight Championship due to being ranked #1 in MLW by Pro Wrestling Illustrated (PWI). Hammerstone confronted Fatu later that night but was attacked by Contra's newest member, the debuting Mads Krügger, turning Hammerstone into a fan favorite. As a result, Hammerstone began feuding with Krügger, leading to a match between the two for Hammerstone's National Openweight Championship at Kings of Colosseum on January 6, 2021. The match ended in a double count-out resulting in Hammerstone retaining the title. Hammerstone defeated Krügger in a Baklei Brawl on the March 2 episode of Fusion to end the feud.

World Heavyweight Champion (2021–present)
After successfully defending the National Openweight Championship against the likes of L.A. Park and Mil Muertes, Hammerstone participated in the Battle Riot match as the #35 entrant at Battle Riot III on July 24, 2021. Hammerstone eliminated the Sentai Death Squad, Josef Samael, Simon Gotch, Daivari and lastly Mads Krügger to win the Battle Riot, thus earning the Golden Ticket which required Hammerstone to cash-in for a World Heavyweight Championship match anytime and anywhere. After retaining the National Openweight Championship against Tom Lawlor on the September 29 episode of Fusion: Alpha, Hammerstone defeated Jacob Fatu in a title versus title match to win the World Heavyweight Championship and retain his National Openweight Championship at Fightland, which aired on October 7. As a result of winning the World Heavyweight Championship, Hammerstone relinquished the National Openweight Championship, ending his two-year reign at 865 days. The following month, at War Chamber, Hammerstone captained The Hammerheads (EJ Nduka, Richard Holliday, Matanza Duran and Savio Vega) to defeat the Contra Unit in the titular match.

He then feuded with Cesar Duran after he refused the promoter's offer, feuding with Black Taurus and King Muertes. On the premiere episode of Azteca on January 6, 2022, Hammerstone and Pagano defeated Taurus and Muertes in an Apocalypto Hardcore match. However, Pagano turned on Hammerstone, taking him on a warehouse, which Richard Holliday rescued him. On the January 27 episode of Azteca, Hammerstone retained the World Heavyweight Championship against Octagon Jr. Hammerstone successfully defended the World Heavyweight Championship against Pagano in a falls count anywhere match on the February 10, 2022 episode of Fusion. After the match, Holliday turned on Hammerstone by attacking him, thus breaking up the Dynasty.

Hammerstone retained the World Heavyweight Championship against Davey Richards at SuperFight and Jacob Fatu and Mads Krügger in a three-way match at Intimidation Games. Hammerstone continued his feud with Holliday. At Rise of the Renegades, Hammerstone teamed with The Von Erichs (Marshall and Ross) as The Von Hammers against King Muertes, Mads Krügger and Richard Holliday in a losing effort in a six-man tag team match. Hammerstone successfully defended the World Heavyweight Championship against Holliday at Kings of Colosseum. On the November 24 episode of Fusion, Hammerstone defeated Holliday in a falls count anywhere match to retain the title and end the feud.

Pro Wrestling Noah (2019) 
On July 26, 2019, MLW announced a working agreement with Japanese based promotion Pro Wrestling Noah, which would include a talent-exchange agreement and content collaboration between the two promotions On July 29, it was announced that Hammerstone would represent MLW by participating in the 2019 N1-Victory, where he wrestled in Block A from August 18 to September 16.

Championships and accomplishments 
AAW Wrestling
AAW Tag Team Championship (1 time) – with Ace Perry
All-Star Wrestling At Gray-Bell
ASW Heavyweight Championship (1 time, current)
Arizona Wrestling Federation
AWF State Championship (1 time)
AWF Tag Team Championship (2 times) - with Joe Graves
DREAMWAVE Wrestling
Good as Gold Rumble (2016)
Future Stars of Wrestling
FSW Heavyweight Championship (3 times, current)
FSW Nevada State Championship (1 time)
FSW Tag Team Championship (1 time) - with Joe Graves
Global Syndicate Wrestling
GSW World Championship (1 time, current)
Lions Pride Sports
Lions Pride Sports 360 Championship (1 time)
Major League Wrestling
 MLW World Heavyweight Championship (1 time, current)
 MLW National Openweight Championship (1 time)
 Battle Riot (2021)
MLW National Openweight Championship Tournament (2019)
Paragon Pro Wrestling
PPW Tag Team Championship (1 time) - with Alex Chamberlain
Power Precision Pro Wrestling
3PW Tag Team Championship (1 time) - with Joe Graves
PCW Ultra
PCW Ultra Heavyweight Championship (1 time, current)
 Pro Wrestling Illustrated
 Ranked No. 24 of the top 500 singles wrestlers in the PWI 500 in 2022
West Coast Pro Wrestling
WCPW Heavyweight Championship (1 time)
WCPW Heavyweight Championship Tournament (2019)
West Coast Wrestling Connection
WCWC Legacy Championship (1 time)
WCWC Pacific Northwest Championship (2 times)
WCWC Tag Team Championship (1 time) – with The Grappler 3

References

External links
 Alexander Hammerstone on MLW.com
 
 
 

1991 births
Living people
Sportspeople from Glendale, Arizona
American male professional wrestlers
Professional wrestlers from Arizona
MLW World Heavyweight Champions
MLW National Openweight Champions
21st-century professional wrestlers
AAW Tag Team Champions